Radomiak Radom II is a Polish football team, which serves as the reserve side of Radomiak Radom. It was founded in 1955. Team's greatest achievement is 10th place in the Third League.

History 
The team participated in the 1984–85 Polish Cup edition. In the first round, they had defeated Gwardia Chełm 3–0 and suffered a 0–1 loss in the following round against Avia Świdnik. It was their best performance in the Polish Cup; they had played twice before and were eliminated after the first game (1978/79 – 0–4 against Orion Niedrzwica Duża; 1984/85 – 2–2 (p. 2–4) against Prokocim Kraków).

References

External links 
 Radomiak Radom II at 90minut.pl 

 
Football clubs in Radom
Reserve team football in Poland